Naavadakku Paniyedukku is a 1985 Indian Malayalam film, directed and produced by A. R. Rajan. The film stars Baby Kala, P. C. George, Aranmula Ponnamma K. P. A. C. Azeez and M. R. Somasekharan Nair in the lead roles. The film has musical score by V. Dakshinamoorthy.

Cast
Baby Kala
P. C. George
Aranmula Ponnamma
K. P. A. C. Azeez
O. P. Pillai
M. R. Somasekharan Nair

Soundtrack
The music was composed by V. Dakshinamoorthy and the lyrics were written by Mavelikkara Devamma.

References

External links
 

1985 films
1980s Malayalam-language films